Nicolas Stern (born September 12, 1965) is an American film producer. Member of an artist family, he is the son of Golden Globe-winning actress Samantha Eggar and actor/producer Tom Stern. His sister, Jenna Stern, is a film actress.

Selected filmography
In God's Hands (1998)
Random Hearts (1999)American Virgin (2000)Training Day (2001)Around the Bend (2004)Catwoman (2004)Starsky & Hutch (2004)Torque (2004)North Country (2005)Rumor Has It... (2005)The Holiday (2006)Vacancy'' (2007)

References

External links
 

American film producers
Place of birth missing (living people)
Living people
1965 births